Violet Louise Archer  (24 April 191321 February 2000) was a Canadian composer, teacher, pianist, organist, and percussionist. Born Violet Balestreri in Montreal, Quebec, in 1913, her family changed their name to Archer in 1940. She died in Ottawa on 21 February 2000.

Education and teaching career

Archer earned an L MUS from McGill University in 1934, and a B MUS from McGill in 1936 where she studied composition with Douglas Clarke. She travelled to New York City in the summer of 1942 where she studied with Béla Bartók, "who introduced her to Hungarian folk tunes and to variation technique. She taught at the McGill Conservatory from 1944 to 1947. Later in the 1940s she studied with Paul Hindemith at Yale.  She earned a B MUS from Yale in 1948, and a M MUS also from Yale in 1949. From 1950 to 1953 Archer was Composer-in-Residence at the University of North Texas. From 1953 through 1961 she taught at the University of Oklahoma. Returning to Canada in 1961 for doctoral study at the University of Toronto, she set that aside when, in 1962, she joined the Faculty of Music at the University of Alberta. There she would become chairman of the Theory and Composition Department. She remained at the University of Alberta until her retirement. Her notable students include Larry Austin, Jan Randall, Allan Gilliland, and Allan Gordon Bell.

Musical career 
Archer built a career as a musician and composer in addition to her teaching. She played percussion with the Montreal Women's Symphony Orchestra from 1940 to 1947, a time period when major municipal orchestras were not admitting women to their ranks. In addition to percussion, Archer played clarinet and strings, and worked in Montréal as an accompanist and organist. As a composer, Archer's prolific work of more than 330 compositions included traditional and more contemporary works for instrument and voice. Examples of her wide-ranging work include a 1973 comic opera, Sganarelle, the film score for a 1976 documentary, Someone Cares, and experimentations with electronic music. Her music has been described as "Archer is noted for her 90 compositions written for novice performers, which she wrote to encourage musicians and audiences of all levels to enjoy and understand key elements of modern music like harmony, melody, and rhythm.

Awards and honours
Archer has received honorary degrees from McGill University (1971), University of Windsor (1986), University of Calgary (1989), Mount Allison University (1992), and University of Alberta (1993). In 1983, she was made a Member of the Order of Canada.

In 1985 the three day Violet Archer Festival was held in Edmonton where 14 of her works were performed. This festival is credited as being first festival to honour a living Canadian composer. She is memorialized at Violet Archer Park in the Parkallen neighbourhood of Edmonton. In Calgary, the Prairie Region of Canadian Music Centre Library is home to The Violet Archer Library which holds over 20,000 scores.

In 2021, Violet Archer fonds held at University of Alberta Archives was added to the Canada Memory of the World Register.

The Canadian indie rock band The Violet Archers is named for Archer.

Image Gallery

Selected works 
 3 Concerti, Archer Piano Concerto, Christina Petrowska Quilico, piano, CBC Vancouver Orchestra, Sir John Eliot Gardiner, conductor, Centrediscs(CMCCD)15610
 Women Composers for Organ, Barbara Harbach. Peterborough, NH: Gasparo Records (294), 2006.
 Ovation, Volume 2. Toronto: CBC Records (PSCD 2027-5), 2002.
 Canadian Composers Portraits. Toronto: Centrediscs, (CMCCD 8502) 2002.
 Sinfonietta (CBC Vancouver Chamber Orchestra, John Avison, conductor)
 Trio no. 2 (The Hertz Trio)
 String Quartet no. 3 (University of Alberta String Quartet)
 The Bell (CBC Chorus and Orchestra, Geoffrey Waddington, conductor)
 Northern Landscapes – A Tribute to Violet Archer, Sarah Muir and Ann Nichols, performers with the Columbian Girls Choir and Chanteuses. Edmonton, 1997.
 Surrealistic Portraiture Kenneth Fischer, saxophone, Martha Thomas, piano. Atlanta: ACA Digital (ACD 20036), 2001.
 By a Canadian Lady – Piano Music 1841–1997, Elaine Keillor, piano. Ottawa: Carleton Sound CD1006, 2000.
 Assemblage, Charles Foreman, piano. Calgary: Unical (CD9501), 1995?.
 NORTHERN ARCH, various artists, Edmonton: Arktos Recordings (ARK 94001), 1994.
 Soliloquies for changing Bb and A clarinets (performed by Dennis Prime)
 CROSSROADS, James Campbell, clarinet. Toronto: Centrediscs / Centredisques (CMCCD 4392), 1992.
 Ballade, Charles Foreman, piano. Toronto: Centrediscs, (CMCCD 1684), 1991.
 Hertz Trio. Calgary: Unical Records, 1991.

Songs
 "À la claire fontaine" (SA and Piano) – Berandol Music

See also
Music of Canada
List of Canadian musicians
List of Canadian composers

References

External links
 University of Alberta Archives – Violet Archer Fonds (28 m of textual records. – ca. 750 sounds recordings. – 18 video cassettes. – 20 art works. – 2420 graphic materials.)
 University of Calgary Special Collections – Violet Archer fonds. (0.525 m of textual records.)
 Music of Violet Archer

1913 births
2000 deaths
Canadian people of Italian descent
Quebecers of French descent
Members of the Order of Canada
University of North Texas College of Music faculty
Canadian classical composers
Women classical composers
Musicians from Montreal
Pupils of Béla Bartók
Pupils of Paul Hindemith
20th-century classical composers
20th-century Canadian composers
20th-century women composers
Canadian women composers